A Girl from Palestine (Egyptian Arabic: فتاة من فلسطين translit: Fatah Min Falastin) is a 1948 Egyptian film starring and directed by Mahmoud Zulfikar.

Plot 
During 1948 war, an Egyptian fighter pilot stubbornly defends the Palestinian land against the Israeli enemy. In the same air raid, his plane crashes in a Palestinian village, and Salma the Palestinian finds him injured in his foot. She hosts him in her home and works to heal his wounds, which brings the Egyptian and Palestinian hearts closer. Then the film exposes the stories of the Palestinian guerrillas who prefer death to the Zionist occupation, and then we know that Salma's house is nothing but a center for the guerrillas' weapons. The Egyptian pilot admires the girl Salma and her courage until they exchange love and marry in a Palestinian wedding that the guerrillas seduce in the Palestinian popular manner, and the Egyptian pilot returns to complete his mission in defending Palestine.

Main cast 

 Mahmoud Zulfikar
 Souad Muhammed
 Hassan Fayek
 Zainab Sedky
 Salah Nazmi
 Said Khalil
 Wafaa Adel
 Qadriya Mahmoud

References

External links 

 A Girl from Palestine on elCinema

 

1948 films
Films directed by Mahmoud Zulfikar
1940s Arabic-language films
Egyptian war films
Egyptian black-and-white films